Islamiyah Ciputat Vocational High School is a private day school in South Tangerang, Banten for grades 10 through 12.

History
Islamiyah Vocational High School was established in 1965 by Drs. H. Zarkazih Noer who is also the founding father of Islamiyah Foundation. Before the foundation have their own building, they have held the courses in various School
There are few of extra-curricular such as the Sacred Flag Hoisting Troop, marawis, Basketball, Band, etc. One of achievement of Islamiyah's team of The Sacred Flag Hoisting Troop is to become the representative of Tangerang in National-level.

With the vision to produce youth with talent, intelligent, and good religion aspect. In hope that not only vast knowledge but also good spiritual aspect as a Moslem that will apply in their future as a result of their education in Islamiyah Vocational High School

Curriculum 
National Curriculum developed by the Department of Education of Indonesia.

Facilities 
 Sports Field
 language laboratory
 Computer Laboratory
 Networking Laboratory
 Marketing Laboratory
 Accounting Laboratory
 Office Administration Laboratory
 Student Council Office
 musholla / musala 
 Library
 BC Mart
 Cafeteria

Extra-Curricular 
 English Club
 Boy Scout
 Sacred Flag Hoisting Troop
 Futsal
 Basketball
 marawis
 Band

References

External links
 

Educational institutions established in 1965
Vocational schools in Indonesia
Buildings and structures in Banten
Education in Banten
1965 establishments in Indonesia